1000 Connecticut Avenue is a high-rise building located in the United States capital of Washington, D.C. This building replaced a previous structure, built in 1956, which was demolished in the winter of 2007.

Architect
The architect of the current building was James Ingo Freed, who teamed with New York firm of Pei Cobb Freed & Partners to design the postmodern structure of the building. This was one of several projects, including the United States Air Force Memorial that were underway when the architect died in 2005. The previous building was valued at approximately $ 25 million. The previous building served as the headquarters for real estate agency, Manta. The new 1000 Connecticut Avenue was completed in 2012. A law firm, Arent Fox, leases eight floors of the building.

See also
List of tallest buildings in Washington, D.C.

References

External links

Skyscraper office buildings in Washington, D.C.
James Ingo Freed buildings
Demolished buildings and structures in Washington, D.C.